The 2017 ASUN Conference men's soccer tournament, the 39th edition of the tournament, determined the ASUN Conference's automatic berth into the 2017 NCAA Division I Men's Soccer Championship.

Seeds 

The top six of seven teams qualified for the ASUN Tournament. The top two regular season finishers earned a bye to the semifinals.

Bracket

Results

First round

Semifinals

Final

Statistics

Goals

Assists

Shutouts 
There were no shutouts in the tournament.

All-Tournament team 

 Ivan Sakou, Lipscomb - MVP
 Logan Paynter, Lipscomb
 Ivan Alvarado, Lipscomb
 Ryan Birchfield, Lipscomb
 Eduardo Reza, Lipscomb
 Ignazio Muccilli, Jacksonville
 Igor Ferreira, Jacksonville
 Kai Bennett, Jacksonville
 Dennis Zapata, FGCU
 Pablo Jimenez, NJIT
 Deniz Dogan, Stetson

See also 
 2017 Atlantic Sun Conference Women's Soccer Tournament

References

External links 

ASUN Men's Soccer Tournament
ASUN Men's Soccer